EuroAirport Basel Mulhouse Freiburg  is an international airport in the French Alsace region, in the administrative commune of Saint-Louis near the border tripoint between France, Germany, and Switzerland. The airport is jointly administered by France and Switzerland, governed by a 1949 international convention. The airport serves as a base for easyJet Switzerland and mainly features flights to European metropolitan and leisure destinations.

History

Plans for the construction of a joint Swiss–French airport started in the 1930s but were halted by the Second World War.  Swiss planners identified Basel as one of the four cities for which a main urban airport would be developed and recognized that the existing airfield at Sternenfeld in Birsfelden was too small and, due to the development of the adjacent river port facilities, unsuitable for expansion.  The suburb of Allschwil was proposed for a new airport, and this would require being constructed across the Franco-Swiss border, leading to talks with French authorities centered on developing a single airport that would serve both countries, enhancing its international airport status.

France would provide the land and the Swiss canton of Basel-Stadt would cover the construction costs. Basel-Stadt's Grand Council agreed to pay the costs for a provisional airport even before an international treaty was signed (which was not until 1949). Construction began on 8 March 1946 and a provisional airport with a  runway was officially opened on 8 May.

The first enlargement project was approved by referendum in Basel in 1960 and, over the following decades, the terminals and runways were continually extended. In 1984, an annual total of 1 million passengers was reached. In 1987, the trademark name EuroAirport Basel–Mulhouse–Freiburg was introduced.

In 1992 a total of 2 million passengers used the airport. By 1998, this number rose up to 3 million.

In December 1998, Swissair inaugurated service to Newark. Aircraft used on this route included Airbus A310s and A330s. According to the local newspaper bz Basel, Swissair mainly launched the link to prevent another airline from starting it first. The newspaper was possibly referring to Swiss World Airways, which had expressed its desire to connect the two cities. Swiss law stipulated that if a carrier based in the country introduced a route, no other Swiss airline could add that route to its network for ten years. Swissair also hoped the flight would attract people working for pharmaceutical companies in Basel. Crossair, a subsidiary of Swissair, code-shared on the route. The carrier operated a hub at the EuroAirport, from which it flew to 40 regional destinations. As a result, passengers travelling between Newark and one of those cities could change planes in Basel.

Development in the 2000s
Swissair announced in early 2000 that the connection to Newark would conclude in March. By this point, Swiss World Airways had shut down. Swissair explained that the flights suffered from low occupancy, although a bz Basel journalist commented that the airline did not advertise them well.

A decision was made to enlarge the terminals again with a new "Y-finger" dock. The first phase was completed in 2002 and the second phase in 2005.

Crossair was the largest airline at the Basel airport. Following the Swissair liquidation in 2001, the subsequent ending of services in early 2002, and the transformation of Crossair into Swiss International Air Lines, the number of flights from Basel fell and the new terminal was initially underused. In 2004 the low-cost carrier easyJet opened a base at Basel and the passenger totals rose again, reaching 4 million in 2006.

From 2007 until 2009, Ryanair also flew to the airport for the first time. However, as a result of a dispute over landing fees, the airline closed all eight routes. More recently Ryanair announced it would return in April 2014, with the resumption of Basel–Dublin route as well as a short-lived revival of the Basel – London–Stansted route. Ryanair added a Basel-Zagreb route in December 2021.

In May 2008, Air Transat commenced seasonal service to Montreal, Canada.

In December 2014, Swiss International Air Lines announced it would cease all operations at Basel by 31 May 2015 due to heavy competition from low-cost carriers. Swiss faced direct competition on five out of its six Basel routes, all of which were operated by Swiss Global Air Lines. The Lufthansa Group announced it would set up Eurowings' first base outside Germany at the EuroAirport as a replacement. However these plans were later cancelled in favour of Vienna International Airport.

In January 2017, the removal of Basel/Mulhouse from Air Berlin and its Swiss subsidiary Belair's route networks was announced.

International status
EuroAirport is one of the few airports in the world operated jointly by two countries, in this case France and Switzerland. It is governed by a 1949 international convention. The headquarters of the airport's operations are located in Blotzheim, France. The airport is located completely on French soil; it also has a Swiss customs border and is connected to the Swiss customs area by a -long customs-free road to Basel, allowing air travellers access into Switzerland bypassing French customs clearance. The airport is operated via a state treaty established in 1946 wherein the two countries (Switzerland and France) are granted access to the airport without any customs or other border restrictions. The airport's board has eight members each from France and Switzerland and two advisers from Germany.

The airport building is split into two separate sections: Swiss and French. Though the entire airport is on French soil and under French jurisdiction, the Swiss authorities have the authority to apply Swiss laws regarding customs, medical services and police work in the Swiss section, including the customs road connecting Basel with the airport. French police are allowed to execute random checks in the Swiss section as well. With Switzerland joining the Schengen Treaty in March 2009, the air side was rearranged to include a Schengen and non-Schengen zone. As border control is staffed by both Swiss and French border officers, passengers arriving from non-Schengen countries must approach the customs office of the country for which they have received the Schengen entry visa, which is either France or Switzerland. On the other hand, the Schengen area can be left from any Schengen area country.

Due to its international status, EuroAirport has three IATA airport codes: BSL (Basel) is the Swiss code, MLH (Mulhouse) is the French code and EAP (EuroAirport) is the neutral code. Some booking systems show different ticket prices for flights to BSL and MLH, as one of them can be a domestic flight within France (with different rules on fuel taxation, etc.), and in some cases, tickets can be issued where a “flight” between BSL and MLH is shown on the itinerary. The airport's ICAO airport code is LFSB. LSZM, the old code, has been re-assigned to the airport of Mollis.

In 2020, a French court decided that job contracts on the airport are governed by French labor laws, not Swiss ones. Basing on a 2012 agreement, the Swiss companies active on the airport have used Swiss labor regulations, which are more employer-friendly than the French ones. For example, the Swiss laws made it easier to dismiss workers, while the French rules prescribe a 35-hour week, earlier retirement, and much higher compensations in case of dismissals. In exchange, working under Swiss laws results in much higher wages.

Terminal
The EuroAirport consists of a single terminal building, a brick-style main area with four levels and the Y-shaped gate area attached to it. The basement (Level 1) contains the access to the car park, the ground level (Level 2) features the arrivals facilities. Level 3 is the check-in area divided into halls 1–4 while the departure gates are located at Level 4. The gate area features gates 1–2, 20–46, 60–61 and 78–87 of which gates 22–32 are used for non-Schengen flights. Six of the boarding gates feature jet bridges, the others are used for walk- or bus-boarding. As described above, the landside areas are uniquely divided into French and Swiss parts.

Airlines and destinations

Passenger
The following airlines offer regular scheduled and charter flights at the EuroAirport:

Cargo

Statistics

Passenger numbers

Route statistics

Other facilities

 The headquarters of Swiss International Air Lines and Swiss Global Air Lines are on the grounds at EuroAirport Basel–Mulhouse–Freiburg in the Swiss section of the airport; even though the airport is within France, the Swiss head office is only accessible from Switzerland. The Swiss division Swiss Aviation Software has its head office there as well.
 Farnair Switzerland formerly had its head office at EuroAirport. As in the case of the Swiss head office, the area with the former Farnair head office may only be accessed from Switzerland. The head office moved to its current location, the Villa Guggenheim in Allschwil, in proximity to EuroAirport, on 1 October 2011.
 Hello, a now defunct Swiss airline, had its head office in the General Aviation area of EuroAirport.
 Prior to the formation of Swiss International Air Lines, the regional airline Crossair was headquartered on the grounds of EuroAirport. Prior to its dissolution, Crossair Europe was headquartered on the grounds of EuroAirport as well.

Ground transportation

Car

The airport is connected to motorway A3 which leads from Basel to the southeast of Switzerland passing Zürich.

Bus
There are several bus connections to and from the EuroAirport to all three countries around it:

On the Swiss exit Basel's BVB bus No. 50 connects the airport to the Basel SBB railway station, which is the main Swiss and French railway station in Basel. During weekdays, there is a service every 7–8 minutes and on weekends, every 10 minutes during daytime. The duration of the trip is about 20 minutes. On the day of a visitor's arrival to Basel, a reservation confirmation from a local hotel guarantees a free transfer by public transport from the station or the EuroAirport to the hotel.
On the French exit, Saint-Louis' DistriBus bus No. 11 connects the airport to the Saint-Louis railway station in 10 minutes.
The German private bus company Flixbus calls at Zürich, Basel and Freiburg Germany up to five times a day. FlixBus however only serves the French exit of the airport. Serving Swiss destinations from the French part of the airport is a questionable legal trick, as people transport by foreign companies inside of Switzerland is illegal without official authorization due to cabotage regulations, which will not be granted by Swiss authorities on routes already supported by tax-financed public services. It's illegal to travel between Swiss destinations only. Police started to do random checks and to fine failing travelers. Serving Swiss destinations from abroad however is compliant.

Rail
There are plans to build a dedicated airport rail link opening some time in the 2020s.

Tram
There are two town tramway systems in relatively close proximity to the airport - Basel tramway and Mulhouse tramway. As the former was extended across the border in the 2010s, there are plans to further extend it to serve the airport. Presently, the tramway serves St Louis SNCF Station, where you can change for the shuttle bus to the airport. Plans to extend the Mulhouse tramway to the airport do seem to be further from realization, however.

See also
Transport in Switzerland
Mulhouse–Habsheim Airport

Notes

References

External links 

  
 
 
 
 
 "Franco-Swiss treaty for the construction and use of Basel–Mulhouse airport in Blotzheim" (1949). Text available in French and German.
 History of Basel Airport on Airport Website 
 Information and some history on Airport Website  

Airports in Grand Est
Buildings and structures in Haut-Rhin
Mulhouse
Transport in Freiburg im Breisgau
France–Switzerland border crossings
Airports established in 1946
Binational airports
1946 establishments in Switzerland